Rawhide Creek is a stream in Douglas, Washington, Dodge, and Colfax counties, Nebraska, in the United States.

According to legend, Rawhide Creek was named in about 1849 on account of a man who was skinned to death there by Indians, his hide was left as a warning to other settlers.

The “Legend” Rawhide is from Niobrara County Wyoming. Rawhide Creeks headwaters are located on Denny Ranch, Southwest of Lusk, Wyoming. The Legend of the Rawhide is re-Inacted every July in Lusk.

See also
List of rivers of Nebraska

References

Rivers of Colfax County, Nebraska
Rivers of Dodge County, Nebraska
Rivers of Douglas County, Nebraska
Rivers of Washington County, Nebraska
Rivers of Nebraska